Salman Hessam (born 30 November 1947) is an Iranian athlete. He competed in the men's discus throw at the 1976 Summer Olympics.

References

1947 births
Living people
Athletes (track and field) at the 1976 Summer Olympics
Iranian male discus throwers
Olympic athletes of Iran
Place of birth missing (living people)
Asian Games medalists in athletics (track and field)
Asian Games bronze medalists for Iran
Athletes (track and field) at the 1974 Asian Games
Medalists at the 1974 Asian Games
20th-century Iranian people